Gennadi Kinko (28 October 1942 – 6 December 2007) was a Russian rower. He competed in the men's coxless pair event at the 1976 Summer Olympics.

References

1942 births
2007 deaths
Russian male rowers
Olympic rowers of the Soviet Union
Rowers at the 1976 Summer Olympics